Town Creek is an unincorporated community in Allegany County, Maryland, United States. Town Creek lies on the Potomac River, within the Chesapeake and Ohio Canal National Historical Park across the river from Okonoko, West Virginia. Town Creek takes its name from a nearby stream.

External links

Unincorporated communities in Allegany County, Maryland
Unincorporated communities in Maryland
Maryland populated places on the Potomac River